Tillandsia indigofera is a species of plant in the family Bromeliaceae. It is endemic to Ecuador.  Its natural habitat is subtropical or tropical dry shrubland.

References

indigofera
Endemic flora of Ecuador
Endangered plants
Taxonomy articles created by Polbot